Rozelle Tram Depot is a former tram storage and operations centre that was part of the Sydney tram network. It is the largest remaining tram depot in Sydney. The depot was turned into a food-centric retail complex that opened in September 2016.

History

Rozelle Tram Depot opened on 17 April 1904, working in conjunction with Newtown and Ultimo depots operating trams on the western, south-western and Ryde tram routes. The depot was originally accessed by a reserved track from Glebe which ran along what is now known as Minogue Crescent. Access to the depot was controlled by a signal box situated near the staff waiting room which also served as a changeover point for drivers.

Constructed in stages from 1904 the depot was a 25 road car shed accommodating 96 carriages, this was gradually increased to 125 by 1907. Construction of the second half of the depot in that same year saw the depot cater for an additional 70 trams. From 1918 depot capacity was increased to 200 tram cars.

In 1926 and 1928 the Rozelle Depot gardens won the Garden Competition which was held annually between tram depots.

A Returned Soldiers branch was established by Tramways employees and a Soldiers Memorial was erected on-site at the front of the Traffic Offices on 26 November 1916. This was to commemorate the various depot staff who served in both World War I and World War II. Of the 1,157 Tramway men enlisted during World War I, 139 were either killed or went missing.

Upon closure of Ultimo depot on 27 June 1953, Rozelle depot received additional trams to run the Darling Street Wharf to Canterbury route.

The depot ceased operations on 22 November 1958 upon closure of the Glebe line. On the following day the depot was cleared of all cars and the lines connecting the system were removed.

Soon after its closure the depot was leased out to several different parties, including CHEP, the Sydney City Council and the City Tram Association.

The depot at one stage contained six historic Sydney trams, some of which date back to the 1930s, as well as a Leyland Royal Tiger Worldmaster bus that has been heavily vandalised. The trams that were in near mint condition prior to 2000 were vandalised, stripped and painted with graffiti. Five of the trams belonging to the Sydney Tramway Society were originally acquired and stored in the shed as part of a now defunct plan by the City of Sydney council to introduce a heritage tramway to The Rocks. One of the trams was R1 class 1995, the last tram to operate on Sydney's original tram network, entering Randwick Tramway Workshops in February 1961 on the last day of operations.<
 
A development proposal submitted in 2005 that included multi-storey apartments, underground car parking and commercial offices ran into opposition from residents. The site has been considered for a variety of uses, including a market, artists' studios, performance spaces.

On 10 December 2010 it was announced the entire Harold Park Paceway site had been purchased by Mirvac to be redeveloped for medium-density housing.

The last tram was removed in January 2015. It was restored in Bendigo and returned for inclusion in the Tramsheds shopping centre that opened on 22 September 2016.

Summary phases of Former Rozelle Tram Depot site:
 1827-1904 Estuarine land, part of Toxteth Estate
 1904-1909 Tram Depot Establishment
 1904-1958 Tram Depot in Operation
 1959-1980s Storage, Depot and Workshop
 1980s-2004 General Store
 2004-2012 Vacant Building
 Present Tramsheds shopping centre owned by REVELOP

Gallery

References

Industrial buildings in Sydney
Shopping centres in Sydney
Tram depots in Sydney
Transport infrastructure completed in 1904
Glebe, New South Wales